Qarajeh (also Romanized as Qarājeh; also known as Karahjah and Karīmābād) is a village in Kolah Boz-e Sharqi Rural District, in the Central District of Meyaneh County, East Azerbaijan Province, Iran. At the 2006 census, its population was 335, in 70 families.

References 

Populated places in Meyaneh County